Mike "Sporo" Mangena (born 1960)
is a retired South African football (soccer) striker who last played for Kaizer Chiefs.

Youth career
Mangena started playing soccer for Chiawelo United Stars at the age of 7.

Kaizer Chiefs
Mangena was signed to the Chiefs reserves in 1978 and was promoted the same year. He moved to Wits University in 1980.

Watford
He moved to Watford in 1984. He was a teammate of John Barnes and Mo Johnston under Graham Taylor.

Bush Bucks
He was a teammate of Mlungisi Ngubane and older brother of Neil Tovey, Mark Tovey when he was the top goal scorer in the NPSL with 25 goals under Clive Barker. He was edged by Ernest Mtawali to the 1985 Footballer of the Year award.

Mamelodi Sundowns
Mangena joined Sundowns on 10 January 1986 for a record R40 000. He made his debut on 9 February 1986 in a 2--1 win over Bush Bucks. Mangena was part of the squad that travelled to watch the 1986 FA Cup final in England. Sundowns played a 2--2 draw where Mangena scored a brace in a pre-match friendly against Crystal Palace reserves on 10 May 1986. Mangena was sold to Moroka Swallows on 8 June 1986.

Kaizer Chiefs
He ended his short 12-year career at the age of 30 where he won the MTN 8, JPS and Bob Save Super Bowl.

After Retirement
Since 1990 he has worked as a soccer analyst at SABC; and he is the owner of Harcourts Unlimited, a real estate business based in the historic Kliptown, Soweto.

In November 2018, Mangena was arrested after a drug manufacturing lab was found on his property.

Personal life

Mangena was charged and arrested after a drug manufacturing plant was found in his house in Randfontein.

References

1960 births
Living people
Kaizer Chiefs F.C. players
Durban Bush Bucks players
Association football forwards
South African soccer players
Sportspeople from Soweto